Two modern navies have been known in English as the Chinese Navy:
People's Liberation Army Navy
Republic of China Navy

For Chinese navies before 1912, see:
Imperial Chinese Navy
Naval history of China